The electoral district of Ovens Valley is an electoral district of the Victorian Legislative Assembly in Australia. It was created in the redistribution of electoral boundaries in 2013, and came into effect at the 2014 state election.

It largely covers areas from the abolished district of Murray Valley, centering on the city of Wangaratta. It includes the towns of Yarrawonga, Cobram, and other towns in the local government areas of Moira, Wangaratta, and Alpine.

The abolished seat of Murray Valley was held by Nationals MP Tim McCurdy, who retained the new seat at the 2014 election.

Members

Election results

References

External links
 District profile from the Victorian Electoral Commission

Ovens Valley, Electoral district of
2014 establishments in Australia
Hume (region)
Wangaratta
Shire of Moira
Alpine Shire